The 2018 Mid-Eastern Athletic Conference baseball tournament began on May 16 and ended on May 19 at Sliwa Stadium on the campus of Embry-Riddle Aeronautical University in Daytona Beach, Florida.  It is a six-team double elimination tournament.  As winner, North Carolina A&T claimed the Mid-Eastern Athletic Conference's automatic bid to the 2018 NCAA Division I baseball tournament.  Bethune-Cookman has claimed sixteen of the nineteen tournament championships, with Florida A&M winning in 2015, Savannah State in 2013 and North Carolina A&T earning the 2005 title.

Format and seeding
The top three teams from each of the MEAC's two divisions will be seeded one through three based on regular season records, with first round matchups of the second seed from the North and the third seed from the South and the second seed from the South against the third seed from the North.  The top seeds will receive a single bye and play the winners of the first round matchups, while the losers will play an elimination game.

Bracket

References

Tournament
Mid-Eastern Athletic Conference Baseball Tournament
MEAC baseball tournament
Mid-Eastern Athletic Conference Baseball